The 2021 Central Michigan Chippewas football team represented Central Michigan University in the 2021 NCAA Division I FBS football season. They were led by third-year head coach Jim McElwain and played their home games at Kelly/Shorts Stadium as members of the West Division of the Mid-American Conference.

The Chippewas completed their regular season with an 8–4 record and accepted a bid to the Arizona Bowl, where they were due to face the Boise State Broncos. On December 27, Barstool Sports (the title sponsor of the bowl) founder David Portnoy announced the withdrawal of the Broncos from the bowl due to COVID-19 issues within the program; organizers stated that they would attempt to secure a replacement team to face the Chippewas. Later in the day, the Arizona Bowl was canceled, and Central Michigan was named as a replacement team for the Sun Bowl to face the Washington State Cougars.

Previous season

The Chippewas finished the 2020 season 3–3 to finish in third place in the West Division.

Schedule

Game summaries

at Missouri

Robert Morris

at LSU

FIU

at Miami (OH)

at Ohio

Toledo

Northern Illinois

at Western Michigan (Michigan MAC Trophy)

Kent State

at Ball State

Eastern Michigan (Michigan MAC Trophy)

vs. Washington State (Sun Bowl)

References

Central Michigan
Central Michigan Chippewas football seasons
Sun Bowl champion seasons
Central Michigan Chippewas football